The 1995–96 Georgia Tech Yellow Jackets men's basketball team represented the Georgia Institute of Technology as a member of the Atlantic Coast Conference during the 1995–96 NCAA men's basketball season. Led by 15th year head coach Bobby Cremins, the Yellow Jackets reached the Sweet Sixteen of the NCAA tournament.

Roster

Schedule

|-
!colspan=9 style=| Non-conference regular season

|-
!colspan=9 style=| ACC regular season

|-
!colspan=9 style=| ACC tournament

|-
!colspan=9 style=| NCAA tournament

Rankings

Players in the 1996 NBA draft

References

Georgia Tech Yellow Jackets men's basketball seasons
Georgia Tech
Georgia Tech